The Acton Centre Historic District encompasses the historic heart of the once-rural, now suburban, town of Acton, Massachusetts.  The district includes properties on Main Street, Wood and Woodbury Lanes, Newtown, Concord, and Nagog Hill Roads, and has been the town's civic heart since its establishment in the 1730s.  It was added to the National Register of Historic Places in 1983.

Description and history
The area that is now Acton was granted to English colonial settlers in 1643, but was not settled until 1680 as part of Concord.  It was separately incorporated in 1735.  The town's early civic buildings and common area were located near its geographic center, which for much of the colonial period remained a small agricultural settlement.  It remained so due to the absence of water power for industrial growth, which led to the growth of West Acton and South Acton.  It was also bypassed by the railroad, but remained of civic importance due to the presence of churches and civic buildings.  Most of the housing stock in Acton Centre is Federal or Greek Revival in style, although there are some houses that have later Italianate and Queen Anne styling, and there are several Colonial Revival houses.

The historic district extends along Main Street (Massachusetts Route 27) from the triangular common in the west to Nagog Hill in the east, and includes a few buildings on adjacent roadways.  The common is the remnant of the town's original common, established in 1731, and houses the town's monument to the American Revolutionary War.  It was here that the town's militia company mustered for the Battles of Lexington and Concord that sparked the conflict.  The town's main civic buildings are in the district: the Congregational Church (1846, later restyled with Queen Anne details), the Town Hall (1863, Italianate), and Acton Memorial Library (1889, Romanesque Revival).

See also
National Register of Historic Places listings in Middlesex County, Massachusetts

References

Historic districts in Middlesex County, Massachusetts
Buildings and structures in Acton, Massachusetts
National Register of Historic Places in Middlesex County, Massachusetts
Historic districts on the National Register of Historic Places in Massachusetts